Maclaine Diemer is a multimedia music composer. He worked on sound design and composing music for the Rock Band game series, and massively multiplayer online game (MMO) Guild Wars 2.

Early life 
Maclaine started playing guitar when he was 12. He enjoyed listening to the classic rock music genre with his parents, namely the Beatles, Jimi Hendrix and Led Zeppelin. During his older years Maclaine enjoyed listening to Van Halen and The Beach Boys.

Maclaine studied music at the Berklee College of Music in Boston, and graduated in 2003.

Career 
In June 2008, Maclaine started working as a sound designer and composer at Harmonix Music Systems for 2 years. During this time, he worked on sound design and composing music for many of Harmonix's games. He worked on The Beatles: Rock Band, Rock Band 2, and Rock Band 3. Maclaine left Harmonix in July 2010 to work at ArenaNet.

In July 2010, Maclaine joined the ArenaNet team as a sound designer for the game Guild Wars 2, and later in 2012 he became the company's lead composer for the game. During his time as lead composer, he worked on soundtracks for Guild Wars 2's Living World Season 1, Living World Season 2, Guild Wars 2: Heart Of Thorns, Living World Season 3, Guild Wars 2: Path Of Fire, and Living World Season 4.

In April 2019, Maclaine stepped down as lead composer at ArenaNet to pursue other projects. However, he is still writing music for Guild Wars 2.

In July 2022, Maclaine joined Cyan Worlds as the composer for the adventure game Firmament.

Works

Video Games 

 Rock Band 2 (2008)
 The Beatles: Rock Band (2009)
 Rock Band 3 (2010)
 Guild Wars 2 (2012)
 Guild Wars 2: Heart of Thorns (2015)
 Guild Wars 2: Path of Fire (2017)
 Crucible (2020)
 Guild Wars 2: End of Dragons (2022)
 Firmament (2023)

Musical style and influences 
Maclaine influences come from a variety of artists and film scores. One of the biggest influences for Maclaine is John Williams in the Star Wars franchise. Other inspirations for Maclaine are Jerry Goldsmith in the Star Trek franchise, Howard Shore in the Lord Of The Rings, and Bernard Herman.

While working on Living World Season 2 for Guild Wars 2, Maclaine wanted to record some of the soundtracks in a live orchestra. He collaborated with Dynamedion to record the music in Berlin, Budapest, and Seattle. The music for the announcement trailer for Guild Wars 2: Heart of Thorns was also composed in a live orchestra.

Legacy 
The music that Maclaine and Lena Chappelle composed for Guild Wars 2: Heart of Thorns was played in a live orchestra by The Evergreen Philharmonic Orchestra. The Orchestra involved many students from Issaquah High School, and they played multiple soundtracks featured in Heart of Thorns.

Game Awards

References

External links 

 Official website
 SoundCloud profile
 YouTube Music channel

Video game composers
21st-century male musicians
Living people
Year of birth missing (living people)